Agatha Christie (1890–1976) was an English detective fiction writer and creator of fictional detectives Hercule Poirot and Miss Marple.

Agatha Christie may also refer to:

TV 
 Agatha Christie: A Life in Pictures, a 2004 BBC docudrama
 Agatha Christie's Great Detectives Poirot and Marple, a 2004 Japanese anime cartoon TV show
 The Agatha Christie Hour, a 1982 TV show based on the short story collection The Listerdale Mystery
 Agatha Christie's Poirot (1989–2013), based on the Hercule Poirot books, with David Suchet as Poriot
 Agatha Christie's Marple (2004–2013), based on the Miss Marple books, with Geraldine McEwan and Julia McKenzie as Miss Marple

Video Games 
 Agatha Christie: Behind the Screen, a 1986 VCR-based interactive videogame
 Agatha Christie (video game series), a series (2005–2009) of videogame adaptations of mystery stories by Agatha Christie, created by video game developers AWE Productions and DreamCatcher Interactive:
 Agatha Christie: And Then There Were None, a 2005 adventure game adapted from the Agatha Christie story of the same name
 Agatha Christie: Murder on the Orient Express, 2006 adventure game adapted from the Agatha Christie story of the same name
 Agatha Christie: Evil Under the Sun, a 2007 adventure game adapted from the Agatha Christie story of the same name
 Agatha Christie: The ABC Murders (2009 video game), a 2009 adventure game adapted from the Agatha Christie story of the same name
 Agatha Christie: The ABC Murders (2016 video game), a 2016 adventure game adapted from the Agatha Christie story of the same name created by Artefacts Studio

Other 
 Agatha Christie: An Autobiography, a 1977 posthumous book
 Agatha Christie (band), a Soviet rock band
 Agatha Christie Award (Japan), a Japanese literary award
 Agatha-Christie-Krimipreis, a German literary award

See also

 Agatha Christie bibliography
 Adaptations of Agatha Christie
 Hercule Poirot 
 Miss Marple
 Wagatha Christie, a popular name for a 2022 dispute and court case